Ion Lavi Hrib (born 23 February 1973) is a Romanian former football defender. After he ended his playing career, he worked for a while as a manager.

Honours

Player
Steaua București
Divizia A: 1992–93, 1997–98
Cupa României: 1998–99

Manager
CS Buftea
Liga III: 2011–12

References

1973 births
Living people
Romanian footballers
Association football forwards
Liga I players
Liga II players
Liga Leumit players
Serie D players
FC Callatis Mangalia players
FC Sportul Studențesc București players
AFC Rocar București players
FC Steaua București players
FC Brașov (1936) players
FC Progresul București players
FC U Craiova 1948 players
CSM Ceahlăul Piatra Neamț players
FC Astra Giurgiu players
FCV Farul Constanța players
Hapoel Tzafririm Holon F.C. players
Cosenza Calcio 1914 players
Romanian expatriate footballers
Expatriate footballers in Israel
Expatriate sportspeople in Israel
Romanian expatriates in Israel
Romanian expatriate sportspeople in Israel
Expatriate footballers in Italy
Expatriate sportspeople in Italy
Romanian expatriates in Italy
Romanian expatriate sportspeople in Italy
Romanian football managers
LPS HD Clinceni managers
Sportspeople from Constanța